Sodium hypobromite is the inorganic compound with the formula NaBrO.  It is usually obtained as the pentahydrate, so the material that is usually called sodium hypobromite has the formula NaOBr • 5H2O. It is a yellow-orange solid that is soluble in water. It adopts a monoclinic crystal structure with a Br–O bond length of 1.820 Å. It is the Na+ salt of OBr−.  It is the bromine analogue of sodium hypochlorite, the active ingredient in common bleach.  In practice the salt is usually encountered as an aqueous solution.

Sodium hypobromite arises by treatment of aqueous solution of bromine with base:
Br2  +  2NaOH  →  NaBr  +  NaBrO  +  H2O

It can be prepared in situ for use as a reagent, such as in the synthesis of 3-aminopyridine from nicotinamide (Hofmann rearrangement).

References

Hypobromites
Sodium compounds